The London Blitz are an American football team based in Finsbury Park, North London, England, who compete BAFA National Leagues Premier Division South, the highest level of British American football. They were formed in 1995 and operate from Finsbury Park Athletics Stadium. They are one of the Britain's most successful teams and are five-time BritBowl winners as well as European Champions following their EFAF Cup triumph in 2011. They have also seven divisional titles to their name.

The Blitz also operate a handful of Youth teams as well as fielding a second team in the BAFANL, the London Blitz B were formed in 2015 and are currently members of the SFC 2 South Division, the third level of the British League,  Blitz B have made the play-offs on several occasions and have won one divisional title.

History
The Blitz field a senior team in the BAFA National Leagues Premiership as well as youth teams.  The roster has included both local players as well as players from North America, Jamaica, South Africa, Uganda, and Nigeria. The team remained in the Premier division following the 2007 BAFL re-alignment.

The team was formed in 1995 after a merger between pre-existing sides: the Ealing Eagles (1984–1994) and the Woking Generals (1988–1993). The Blitz rose from the lower divisions of the then-British Senior League to the Premier Division. They won the British national championship, BritBowl XXI, in 2007, defeating Coventry Cassidy Jets 14–6. They returned to defend the title in 2008, missing out to a field goal with 4 seconds left to play losing 32–33 against Coventry Cassidy Jets in a repeat of the 2007 match. In 2009 and 2010 the Blitz have cemented their place as the premier team in the UK by winning back to back BritBowls. In 2009 at the Keepmoat Stadium in Doncaster they defeated the Coventry Jets 26–7 in BritBowl XXIII, then in 2010 at Sixways Stadium in Worcester facing the Coventry Jets for the fourth consecutive final they won 34–20 in BritBowl XXIV.
The team participated in their sixth consecutive BritBowl in September 2011. They defeated the London Warriors 18 – 0 at Crystal Palace National Sports Centre in London. The 2011 double triumph of EFAF Cup and BritBowl was the most successful season for a British American Football team since the achievements of the London Olympians in the early nineties.

In 2010, the London Blitz had their first venture into European competition in the EFAF (European Federation of American Football) Cup (the second highest tier of European Club American Football), the Blitz defeated the Amsterdam Crusaders in the Netherlands and Les Cougars de Saint-Ouen L'Aumone (from the outskirts of Paris) at home in the group stage but then lost in the semi-final to the Carlstad Crusaders in Sweden.

In 2011, they again entered the EFAF Cup. They won their group matches comfortably, beating the Amsterdam Crusaders again, this time at home and then defeated the Valencia Firebats in Spain. The Blitz hosted the Danish Champions the Søllerød Gold Diggers in the semi-final beating them 23–7. The final was held at Finsbury Park on 2 July 2011. In front of a crowd of nearly 2,000 people the London Blitz won the EFAF Cup by beating the Serbian Champions, the Kragujevac Wild Boars 29–7.

2012 saw the Blitz lose games in both Europe and in the domestic league for the first time in a few years. In Europe they took part in the EFL Eurobowl for the first time in the club's history. Group wins in Paris against the La Courneuve Flash and at home to L'Hospitalet Pioners from Spain led to a quarter final in Berlin against the Berlin Adler. The Blitz dominated most of the game and led late on but eventually lost 21–15. In the re-aligned domestic BAFANL Premiership South league they lost twice during the season to the London Warriors. The first time the Blitz had lost regular season games since 2008. However, they reached their 7th consecutive BritBowl at Don Valley Stadium in Sheffield where they faced the London Warriors again and this time the Blitz finished as winners when it mattered. The final score was 37–21 making the London Blitz national champions for the fourth consecutive year.

Former team captain Roderick Bradley appeared on television as Spartan in the 2008–2009 series of Gladiators. Bradley joined the Blitz in 2005 after attending Loughborough University. After a long and successful career he has since retired from playing. Ex quarterback and Britbowl MVP Fred Boyle joined the Blitz in 2009 after leading the Hertfordshire Hurricanes for four years at the University of Hertfordshire. He too has since retired from playing after Blitz lost out to the Warriors in Britbwol XXVIII. The club chairman is Ed Morgan who joined the Blitz in 2006 after attending Leeds University. Bradley, Boyle and Morgan have represented Great Britain in the sport along with many other Blitz players.

Current team captain and wide receiver Charlie Joseph has come up through the ranks from the Blitz Junior program and GB Juniors.

Blitz B Team

In 2015 London Blitz entered a development team 'London Blitz B' into the BAFA National League SFC2 East. The team is led by head coach Anthony Coverdale. The team has reached the Division Two play-offs on three occasions and has one Divisional title.

Stadium

The Blitz and B Team both operate from Finsbury Park Athletics Stadum.

Team colours 
London Blitz play in white helmets (with navy blue oval logo), navy blue jerseys with white numbers, white shorts, and navy blue socks. Their alternative kit is white jerseys with navy blue numbers, navy blue shorts and white socks.

Head coaches 
 1995–96 – Chris Williams
 1997–99 – Damon Kirby
 2000–03 – Adrian Klemens
 2003–05 – Nick Rockell
 2006–15 – Mark Moss
 2016–   – Damian Anderson

Results – domestic and European competition

See also
British American Football League
BAFA National Leagues

References

External links
Official Site

BAFA National League teams
American football teams in England
American football teams in London
American football teams established in 1995
1995 establishments in England